Tyron Kaymone Frampton  (born 18 December 1994), better known by his stage name Slowthai (stylised in lowercase), is a British rapper. Raised in Northampton, he rose to popularity in 2019 for his gritty and rough instrumentals and raw, politically charged lyrics, especially around Brexit and Theresa May's tenure as British prime minister. Slowthai placed fourth in the BBC Sound of 2019 and followed up in the same year with his debut studio album, Nothing Great About Britain. The album was nominated for the Mercury Prize; at Slowthai's 2019 Mercury Prize ceremony performance, he held a fake severed head of British prime minister Boris Johnson on stage, prompting controversy.

Early life

Tyron Kaymone Frampton was born on 18 December 1994 in Northampton to Gaynor, a teenage mother of Barbadian descent. Frampton, his sister, and his brother were raised by their single mother in a council estate in the Lings area of Northampton. His younger brother Michael died shortly after his first birthday, which greatly affected Frampton. Frampton attended Northampton Academy and in 2011 attended Northampton College, where he studied for a BTEC in Music Technology. Frampton has ADHD. 

Frampton frequently skipped school during his years at Northampton Academy and often spent time at a nearby underground "recording studio" at his friend's house, only stopping when his mother was forced to attend a compulsory court hearing. After college, Frampton had multiple short stints in employment, working as a labourer, a plasterer, and at a branch of Next before being fired for breach of contract after he gave his friend employee discounts.

Career

2016–2019: Beginnings and Nothing Great About Britain 
The name Slowthai originates from his childhood nickname given to him due to his slow speech and drawled tone: "slow ty". In 2016, he released his breakout single, "Jiggle", produced by Sammy Byrne.

In 2017, Slowthai partnered up with indie record label Bone Soda to release his I Wish I Knew EP, "Murder" and "T n Biscuits". Later in the same year, Slowthai signed his recording contract with Method Records and since has released his Runt EP and debut studio album, Nothing Great About Britain, which peaked at number 9 on the Official Charts on the week of release.

In addition to being included in the BBC's Sound of 2019 poll and NMEs NME 100 list, Slowthai as well received acclaim from publications such as DIY, Vevo and Metro. Alongside that, his debut album was shortlisted for a Mercury Music Prize, losing to Dave's Psychodrama.

Slowthai contributed additional, uncredited vocals on the song "What's Good" from Tyler, the Creator's album Igor. He is also featured on "Heaven Belongs to You" from Brockhampton's album Ginger and later joined their HBTY North American tour in 2019 as the special guest.

 2020–2021: Tyron 
In January 2020, Slowthai was featured alongside UK punk band Slaves on Gorillaz's single "Momentary Bliss". The single was the first "episode" of their Song Machine project.He also collaborated with a South African artist by the name of Waywo, otherwise known as Wayden Harker

On 12 February 2020, after winning the Hero of the Year award at the NME Awards, Slowthai made sexual comments about host Katherine Ryan. After audience members began shouting at him, Slowthai dropped his microphone into the crowd, which was then thrown back at him along with a drink. Slowthai then threw his own drink and jumped into the crowd. Slowthai has since apologised, while Ryan has said the situation was taken the wrong way.

On 10 May 2020, Slowthai released the single "Enemy". On 13 May 2020, Slowthai released the single "Magic" with producer Kenny Beats. The following day, on 14 May 2020, Slowthai released the single "BB (Bodybag)".

On 15 September 2020, Slowthai released the single "Feel Away" featuring James Blake and Mount Kimbie. The song was said to be a tribute to his brother, for the anniversary of his death. On 19 November, Slowthai released the single "nhs" alongside a tracklist for his album Tyron, releasing 5 February 2021, which was then delayed a week, and planned to release 12 February 2021. On 18 December 2020, Slowthai released "Thoughts" as a non-album single, along with a lyric video that featured local police responding to a complaint of a social gathering. On 5 January 2021, Slowthai released "Mazza", a single featuring A$AP Rocky. On 9 February 2021, Slowthai released "Cancelled", a single featuring Skepta. On 12 February 2021, Slowthai released the album Tyron, which has features including Skepta, Dominic Fike, James Blake, A$AP Rocky and Denzel Curry.

 2022–present: Ugly 
On 9 November 2022, Slowthai released "I Know Nothing". On 25 January 2023, Slowthai released the single "Selfish" and announced his new album, UGLY, which was released on 3 March 2023. UGLY is an acronym which stands for "U Gotta Love Yourself".

 Personal life 
Slowthai is a supporter of his hometown football team Northampton Town, with parts of the music video for "Gorgeous" having been filmed at Northampton Town's Sixfields Stadium. He has also stated that he supports Liverpool F.C.

In the summer of 2020, Slowthai got engaged to Russian singer and model Katya Kischuk, former member of the Russian girl group Serebro, whom he met online. On 18 June 2021, Kischuk gave birth to the couples' son. In December 2022, Kischuk announced to her Telegram chat that the couple had separated.

In February 2023, in an interview with Rolling Stone, Slowthai confirmed his relationship with British pop singer Anne-Marie.

Musical style
His music has been categorised as grime and hip hop. He often includes elements of punk rock, leading to the categorisation of grime-punk. In a 2019 article for the BBC, Kev Geoghegan described him as "either a grime MC making punk music or a punk making rap music". In an article for Vice Media, Niloufar Haidari described his music as "caustically witty bars over abrasive beats that blend grime, trap, Soundcloud rap and even punk and screamo".

He has cited as musical influences Gesaffelstein, Juelz Santana, Elliott Smith, Radiohead, Nirvana, Mount Kimbie, Alex Turner of Arctic Monkeys, Jay-Z,  Sex Pistols, Justice, Oasis and Die Antwoord.

Discography
Studio albums

Extended plays

SinglesNotes'''

 Appears on the deluxe edition of Nothing Great About Britain'' only.
 "The Bottom" and "North Nights" were released as a double A-side.

As featured artist

Other charted songs

Guest appearances

Awards and nominations

References

External links 
 

1994 births
Living people
English hip hop musicians
English male rappers
English people of Barbadian descent
English people of Irish descent
Musicians from Northamptonshire
People from Northampton
People with attention deficit hyperactivity disorder